A disease outbreak was first reported in Equatorial Guinea on 7 February 2023 and, on 13 February 2023, it was identified as being Marburg virus disease. It was the first time the disease was detected in the country. As of 25 February 2023, there is one confirmed case and 24 suspected cases, including nine deaths, in Equatorial Guinea.



Background

Marburg virus disease is a viral hemorrhagic fever caused by the Marburg virus, with a case fatality ratio of up to 88 percent. Symptoms are similar to Ebola virus disease. There are no vaccines or antiviral treatments for Marburg.

Outbreak

An outbreak of an unidentified illness was first reported on 7 February 2023 and linked to people who took part in a funeral ceremony in Kié-Ntem province's Nsok-Nsomo district. Eight deaths were reported by 10 February 2023, prompting a local lockdown, while Cameroon introduced border restrictions. Reported symptoms included nose bleeds, fever, joint pain and other ailments.

On 13 February 2023, the World Health Organization and Equatorial Guinea's health ministry announced that one of the samples sent to the Pasteur Institute laboratory in Senegal had tested positive for Marburg virus. At that time, there were 25 suspected cases, including 9 deaths. The condition of the confirmed case was not reported.

Neighbouring Cameroon detected two suspected cases of Marburg virus disease on 13 February 2023., but they were later ruled out.

On 25 February 2023, a suspected case of Marburg was reported in the Spanish city of Valencia, however this case was subsequently discounted.

On 28 February 2023, Equatoguinean Health Minister Mitoha Ondo'o Ayekaba reported that there had been two more deaths of people with symptoms of the disease.

See also
 List of epidemics
 List of other Filoviridae outbreaks

References

Further reading
 

2023 in Equatorial Guinea
2023 disease outbreaks
February 2023 events in Africa
Marburgviruses
Disease outbreaks in Equatorial Guinea